Hardee House is a historic home located near Ormondsville, Greene County, North Carolina.  It was built between about 1842 and 1844, and is a two-story, single pile, three bay, Greek Revival style I-house dwelling.  It has an early-20th century Queen Anne style front porch with turned posts and decorative sawnwork brackets.  Also on the property is a contributing -story gable-roof tobacco pack house.

It was listed on the National Register of Historic Places in 2014.

References

Houses on the National Register of Historic Places in North Carolina
Greek Revival houses in North Carolina
Queen Anne architecture in North Carolina
Houses completed in 1844
Houses in Greene County, North Carolina
National Register of Historic Places in Greene County, North Carolina